Joaquim José Correia Rolão Preto (born November 5, 1959) is a Portuguese football manager and former player.

Biography
He was assistant coach of László Bölöni at Sporting Clube de Portugal between 2003 and 2006.

In February 2020, he was announced as the new assistant of Portimonense.

References

External links
 Joaquim Rolão Preto at zerozero.pt 

1959 births
Living people
People from Fundão, Portugal
Portuguese footballers
C.D. Nacional players
C.D. Nacional managers
Primeira Liga managers
Portuguese football managers
Association footballers not categorized by position
Sportspeople from Castelo Branco District